CMF, a three letter abbreviation, may stand for:

Entertainment
 Campus MovieFest, the world's largest student film festival
 Chern Medal Foundation, an organization that bestows the Chern Medal Award in mathematics

Military
 Central Mediterranean Forces, the British component of the Mediterranean theatre of World War II
 Citizen Military Forces (1943–1980), became Australian Army Reserve

Religion
 Christian Missionary Fellowship International (CMF International, formerly CMF), a non-denominational Christian missionary
 Claretians, Roman Catholic religious order, 'CMF' is used as a post nominal

Science and technology
 CMF (chemotherapy), a chemotherapy regimen commonly used in treating breast cancer
 Centre of mass frame in mechanics
 Chaikin Money Flow, a technical stock chart indicator
 Color matching fields or functions, a triplet of spectral sensitivity curves in color vision modeling. See CIE 1931 color space#Color matching functions
 Common Monomial Factor, the factored form of a polynomial, also known as the greatest common divisor of two polynomials
 Composite metal foam, a type of metal foam formed from hollow beads of one metal within a solid matrix of another
 Content management framework for customizing management of media content
 Cranio-maxillofacial surgery, involves the correction of congenital and acquired conditions of the head and face.
 Creative Music File, an AdLib/MIDI hybrid music format developed by Creative Labs
 Critical Manufacturing, a spin-off company of Critical Software
 Cymomotive force, a measurement of radiated power or signal strength from an antenna 
 5-Chloromethylfurfural, an organochlorine compound obtained from fructose
 Renault–Nissan Common Module Family, a modular automobile platform developed by Renault–Nissan Alliance
 Crash Modification Factor, a way of predicting the change in safety for roadway design changes

Society and law
 California Medical Facility, a male-only state prison in California
 Canada Media Fund, a not-for-profit public-private partnership which financially supports the creation of Canadian television and new media
 Certificate of Management Fundamentals, a professional certification from the Commonwealth of Kentucky
 Chambéry Airport (IATA: CMF), in Savoie, France
 Christian Medical Fellowship, an evangelical, interdenominational organisation that links together Christian doctors and medical students in the UK
 Citizens Military Forces, historic reserve units of the Australian Army
 Combined Maritime Forces, a multi-national naval force
 Country Music Foundation, a non-profit, educational organisation, operating The Country Music Hall of Fame and Museum

Other
 Chaikin Money Flow
 City Music Foundation, a music charity in the City of London, England
 Collectible Minifigure, individually sold collectible Lego figures
 Color, Material and Finishes, in CMF design